"Je n'ai que mon âme" ("All I Have is My Soul") is a song by Natasha St-Pier, the  entry in the Eurovision Song Contest 2001. It was sung mainly in French, with some lyrics in English (the first time a French entry contained any English lyrics). The song was released in Canada as the lead single from the compilation album carrying the same name Je n'ai que mon âme.

Eurovision
The song was performed fourteenth on the night, following 's David Civera with "Dile que la quiero" and preceding 's Sedat Yüce with "Sevgiliye son".

The song is a power ballad, with St-Pier attempting to resurrect what appears to be a doomed relationship, telling her lover that she still has feelings for him, even though neither of them have expressed them recently.

It was succeeded as French representative at the 2002 contest by Sandrine François with "Il faut du temps".

Chart performance
In France, the single charted for 26 weeks in the top 100. It started at number 11 on 5 May 2001, then reached the top ten and peaked at number two in the sixth and seventh weeks. It was unable to dislodge MC Solaar's "Hasta la vista" which topped the chart then. Then the single dropped almost continuously on the chart, totalling nine weeks in the top ten and 19 weeks in the top 50. It achieved Gold status awarded by the SNEP and was 28th on the Annual Chart.

In Wallonia, Belgium, "Je n'ai que mon âme" went to number 11 on 12 May 2001, then jumped to number three and hit number two the two weeks later, being blocked behind Daddy DJ's eponymous single. Then it dropped rather quickly on the chart, remaining for seven weeks in the top ten and 12 weeks in the top 40. It was the 17th best-selling single of the year.

Track listings
 CD single
 "Je n'ai que mon âme" — 2:51
 "All I Have Is My Soul" — 2:51
 "Près d'une autre" — 5:29

Charts and sales

Weekly charts

Year-end charts

Certifications

References

External links
 Official Eurovision Song Contest site, history by year, 2001
 Detailed info & lyrics, The Diggiloo Thrush, "Je n'ai que mon âme".
 Official web site, Natasha St-Pier 

2001 debut singles
Eurovision songs of 2001
Eurovision songs of France
Natasha St-Pier songs
2001 songs
Columbia Records singles